William Denton Cox (1883 – 15 April 1912) was a third class steward aboard RMS Titanic who died while bringing groups of third class passengers to lifeboats during the sinking.

Cox was from Southampton and transferred to Titanic from the RMS Olympic. Cox escorted two groups of third class women and children to the lifeboats assisted by stewards John Edward Hart and Albert Victor Pearcey. Cox was last seen headed below to rescue a third group.

His body was found by the cable ship CS Mackay-Bennett and taken to Halifax, initially listed as Body No. 300. He is buried at Fairview Lawn Cemetery in Halifax, Nova Scotia.

References

External links
"Mr. William Denton Cox", article, Encyclopedia Titanica
  

1883 births
1912 deaths
Deaths on the RMS Titanic
People from Southampton
British Merchant Navy personnel